The 2nd constituency of French Guiana is a French legislative constituency in the French Guiana département. Comprising the western two-thirds of the département, the 2nd constituency contains the major communes of Saint-Laurent-du-Maroni (population: 47,621) and Kourou (population: 24,903).

The constituency is represented by Davy Rimane, a left-wing politician aligned with La France Insoumise, who won the seat in the 2022 legislative election.

Deputies

Election results

2022 
Davy Rimane, aligned to La France Insoumise, was elected to the seat in the 2022 French legislative election.

 
 
 

 
 
 
 
 

* Davy Rimane did not officially stand as an LFI candidate, but is supported by them and intends to sit with the NUPES alliance in the National Assembly.

2018 by-election

2017

2012

2007

2002

References

Sources
 French Interior Ministry results website: 
 

French legislative constituencies